Mictocommosis stemmatias is a species of moth of the  family Tortricidae. It is found on Sulawesi, an island in Indonesia.

References

Moths described in 1921
Mictocommosis